Robert William Hooper (October 24, 1810April 13, 1885) was a prominent Boston physician.

Hooper graduated from Harvard College in 1830 and later studied throughout Europe starting in 1833. He returned to the United States in 1835 and obtained a medical degree from Harvard College.

Hooper married Ellen Sturgis on September 25, 1837. Friends thought his wife was intellectually superior to him. Margaret Fuller remarked that the coupling was like "that perfume... wasted on the desert wind". The couple had three children, all of whom outlived Hooper. The marriage ended on November 3, 1848, upon Ellen Hooper's death.

Hooper worked as a surgeon at the Charitable Eye and Ear Infirmary and was a trustee of the Boston Athenaeum for thirty years. Hooper provided most of his services free of charge.

Sources

1810 births
1885 deaths
Harvard Medical School alumni
Physicians from Massachusetts